The George W. Stone House, located on Kentucky Route 80 in or near Millburn in Carlisle County, Kentucky, was built around 1858.  It was listed on the National Register of Historic Places in 1994.

It has Creole Cottage architecture

It is a one-and-a-half-story log house.

It has a long ell behind the house, probably begun as a kitchen.

References

National Register of Historic Places in Carlisle County, Kentucky
Houses completed in 1858
Log buildings and structures on the National Register of Historic Places in Kentucky
1858 establishments in Kentucky
Houses on the National Register of Historic Places in Kentucky
Creole cottage architecture in the United States